Coach Trip 16, also known as Coach Trip: Road to Zante is the sixteenth series of Coach Trip in the United Kingdom. The series was confirmed by E4 on 14 December 2016. Filming took place between 14 May 2017 and 12 June 2017. The series consists of 40 episodes, an increase of previous series, and follow the "Road to..." format. The series began airing on E4 on 24 July 2017 for 40 episodes and concluded on 15 September 2017.

Contestants

Voting history

Notes
 On Day 1, Mark & Mitch were not present at the vote as they were in hospital due to Mitch being injured in the morning activity.

 On Day 5, a couple was randomly selected and the couple that they voted for would receive a yellow card. The couple chosen was Mark & Mitch, meaning that Grant & Tash received a yellow card.

 On Day 7, Hollye was not present at the evening's vote after injuring her foot during the morning activity, resulting in her going to hospital. Her partner, Chantal, still delivered their vote.

 On Day 12, the vote resulted in no couple receiving a majority as all couples received one vote. The group had to discuss which couple would receive a yellow card. If the group did not reach an agreement, each couple would receive a yellow card, meaning five of the six couples on the coach would be eliminated. The yellow card was awarded to Mark & Mitch.

 Shortly after the vote on Day 12, Mark & Mitch announced that they had to return home and walked from the coach.

 Following Mark & Mitch's departure, Hollye announced that she had to return home and walked from the coach. Chantal decided to remain on the coach as she began the trip as a solo traveller.

 On Day 13, Chantal took part in the vote as an individual as she awaited the arrival of her new partner. She continued to have a yellow card after Chantal & Hollye were voted on Day 8.

 On Day 14, the new couples, Choon & Jamie and Abbie & Dunstan, were given the opportunity to remove one couple's yellow card at the vote. Each couple was given the chance to say why they wanted their yellow card removed.

 As the couples boarded the coach on Day 19, Brendan announced that Choon & Jamie had decided to walk from the coach. Therefore, they were not present at the evening's vote.

 On Day 25, each couple voted for the two couples that they wanted to receive a yellow card. The two couples with the most votes received a yellow card.

 On Day 28, Callum & Ryan refused to vote. As voting is mandatory, Brendan had to automatically present the couple with a red card. Larissa & Paige had already voted for Callum & Ryan before their refusal to vote, which therefore became void. Alternatively, each couple was given a chance to discuss the couple that they wanted to vote for following Callum & Ryan's removal.

 On Day 34, Brendan announced that the next couple to receive a red card would choose a couple to have immunity until the final day. On Day 35, Larissa & Paige received a red card and chose Jack & Joe to receive immunity.

The trip by day

References

2017 British television seasons
Coach Trip series
Television shows set in Croatia
Television shows set in France
Television shows set in Greece
Television shows set in Italy